Goodyear Lake is a man-made lake created by the building of the Colliersville Dam. The lake is located southwest of the hamlet of Portlandville in the Town of Milford in Otsego County, New York.

Fishing
Fish species present in the lake are bluegill, black bullhead, largemouth bass, chain pickerel, pumpkinseed sunfish, rock bass, smallmouth bass, walleye, and yellow perch. The lake is accessed by a state-owned carry down boat launch off NY 28 in Portlandville and one off Silliman Cove Road with parking for 15 cars, as well as various areas to shore fish. There is also hotel accommodations off NY 28 on the west shore of the lake.

References 

Lakes of New York (state)
Lakes of Otsego County, New York